Sebastian Fleischer (born 26 December 1993 in Helsingør) is a Danish windsurfer, who specialized in Neil Pryde RS:X class. As of November 2015, he is ranked no. 8 in the world for the sailboard class by the International Sailing Federation.

Fleischer competed in the men's RS:X class at the 2012 Summer Olympics in London by receiving a berth from the World Championships in Cadiz, Spain. Struggling to attain a top position in the opening series, Fleischer accumulated a net score of 220 for a twenty-ninth-place finish in a fleet of thirty-eight windsurfers.

References

External links
 
 
 
 

1993 births
Living people
Danish male sailors (sport)
Olympic sailors of Denmark
Sailors at the 2012 Summer Olympics – RS:X
Sailors at the 2016 Summer Olympics – RS:X
People from Helsingør
Sportspeople from the Capital Region of Denmark
Danish windsurfers